Alexei Petrovich Aidarov (born 15 November 1974) is a Russian-born former Belarusian (until 2006) and Ukrainian (since 2007) biathlete.

Biathlon results
All results are sourced from the International Biathlon Union.

Olympic Games
1 medal (1 bronze)

*Pursuit was added as an event in 2002.

World Championships
4 medals (1 gold, 1 silver, 2 bronze)

*During Olympic seasons competitions are only held for those events not included in the Olympic program.
**Team was removed as an event in 1998, and pursuit was added in 1997 with mass start being added in 1999 and the mixed relay in 2005.

Individual victories
2 victories (1 Sp, 1 Pu)

*Results are from UIPMB and IBU races which include the Biathlon World Cup, Biathlon World Championships and the Winter Olympic Games.

References

External links
 

1974 births
Living people
Sportspeople from Yekaterinburg
Belarusian male biathletes
Ukrainian male biathletes
Biathletes at the 1998 Winter Olympics
Biathletes at the 2002 Winter Olympics
Olympic biathletes of Belarus
Medalists at the 1998 Winter Olympics
Olympic medalists in biathlon
Olympic bronze medalists for Belarus
Biathlon World Championships medalists
Belarusian emigrants to Ukraine
Naturalized citizens of Ukraine